Hsu Mo (October 22, 1893 in Suzhou, province of Jiangsu – June 28, 1956 in The Hague) was a Chinese lawyer, politician and diplomat. He worked from 1931 to 1941 as deputy foreign minister of his country, as ambassador to Australia and to Turkey, and from 1946 until his death as a judge at the International Court of Justice.

Life
Hsu Mo was born in 1893 in Suzhou, and studied law at Peiyang University and at George Washington University. He received his doctorate in Australia at the University of Melbourne. In the 1920s, he worked first as a professor of international law and international relations at Nankai University and later as a judge in various district courts. In 1928, he moved to the Chinese Foreign Ministry, where he worked as a consultant and later as Director of the European-American and Asian Department. Three years later, he became Deputy Minister of Foreign Affairs. After ten years in this position, he became Extraordinary and Plenipotentiary Ambassador to Australia in 1941 and from 1944 to 1946 he was ambassador of his homeland in Turkey.

After the end of World War II, in April 1945, he participated on the United Nations Committee of Jurists in Washington DC, tasked with preparing draft statutes for the then contemplated International Court of Justice. He also served as the rapporteur of the Committee on Chapter VI of the United Nations Charter on the Regulations for the Peaceful Settlement of Disputes. A year later he was elected a judge of the International Court of Justice, where he worked until his death. His successor was his compatriot Wellington Koo.

Hsu Mo became a member of the Institut de Droit International in 1948. He died in 1956, in The Hague.

References
 Raymond M. Lorantas: Hsu Mo. In: Warren F. Kuehl (Hrsg.): Biographical Dictionary of Internationalists. Greenwood Press, Westport 1983, S. 359/360
 Hsu Mo. In: Arthur Eyffinger, Arthur Witteveen, Mohammed Bedjaoui: La Cour internationale de Justice 1946–1996. Martinus Nijhoff Publishers, Den Haag und London 1999, S. 292
 Death of His Excellency Judge Hsu Mo, Member of the International Court of Justice News Release 56/12 of the International Court of Justice of 28 June 1956 on the death of Hsu Mo (available online through the website of the ICJ as PDF File, approximately 70KB)

1893 births
1956 deaths
Academic staff of Nankai University
Diplomats of the Republic of China
International Court of Justice judges
Members of the Institut de Droit International
Ambassadors of China to Australia
Politicians from Suzhou
Republic of China politicians from Jiangsu
Republic of China historians
Writers from Suzhou
20th-century Chinese historians
Historians from Jiangsu
Chinese judges of United Nations courts and tribunals
20th-century Chinese lawyers
20th-century Chinese judges